Zimbabwe participated at the 2017 Summer Universiade which was held in Taipei, Taiwan.
Zimbabwe sent a delegation consisting of only 5 competitors for the event competing in 3 different sports.

Zimbabwe couldn't win any medal in the multi-sport event.

Participants

References

External links 
 official website

Nations at the 2017 Summer Universiade
2017 in Zimbabwean sport